This is a list of paleocontinents, significant landmasses that have been proposed to exist in the geological past. The degree of certainty to which the identified landmasses can regarded as independent entities reduces as geologists look further back in time. The list includes cratons, supercratons, microcontinents, continents and supercontinents. For the Archean to Paleoproterozoic cores of most of the continents see also list of shields and cratons.

List of paleocontinents

References

Palaeocontinent
Paleogeography
Paleocontinent